Milovan "Mike" Bakić (Serbian Cyrillic: Милован Мајк Бакић; born 30 December 1952) is a Canadian retired soccer player.

Club career
Bakić played professional club soccer for Serbian White Eagles, Rochester Lancers, Washington Diplomats and Houston Hurricane. He also played indoor soccer for the Hartford Hellions and Kansas City Comets.

International career
Bakić represented  Canada at the 1977 CONCACAF Championship, scoring two goals in four games. He was the first player of Serbian descent to play for Canada.

He debuted for Canada against Suriname on 12 October 1977, scoring a goal in a 2–1 victory in Mexico City. His last cap came against Mexico on 22 October 1977 in a 1–3 defeat in Monterrey.

International goals
Scores and results list Canada's goal tally first.

References

External links

 

1952 births
Living people
Canadian expatriate sportspeople in the United States
Canadian expatriate soccer players
Canadian soccer players
Canada men's international soccer players
Expatriate soccer players in the United States
Hartford Hellions players
Houston Hurricane players
Serbian White Eagles FC players
Serbian White Eagles FC non-playing staff
Kansas City Comets (original MISL) players
Major Indoor Soccer League (1978–1992) players
Naturalized citizens of Canada
North American Soccer League (1968–1984) players
North American Soccer League (1968–1984) indoor players
Rochester Lancers (1967–1980) players
Serbian emigrants to Canada
Footballers from Belgrade
Washington Diplomats (NASL) players
Yugoslav emigrants to Canada
Canadian National Soccer League players
Association football midfielders